Numena + Geometry (1997) is an album by the American ambient musician Robert Rich. It is a two-disc set containing Rich’s albums Numena (1987) and Geometry (1991).

Track listing

Disc one: Numena
”The Other Side of Twilight” – 25:04
”Moss Dance” – 5:45
”Numen” – 11:51
”The Walled Garden” – 10:32

Disc two: Geometry
”Primes, Part 1” – 5:20
”Primes, Part 2” – 6:34
”Interlocking Circles” – 8:35
”Geometry of the Skies” – 13:48
”Nesting Ground” – 6:13
”Geomancy” – 10:35
”Amrita (Water of Life)” – 6:39
”Logos” – 9:57

External links
Hearts of Space Records Album Page

Robert Rich (musician) albums
1997 compilation albums
Hearts of Space Records albums